Leslie Christopher Taylor (born December 27, 1948, in Oneida, Kentucky, United States) is an American country music artist. Taylor has released two studio albums on Epic Records. His highest charting single, "I Gotta Mind to Go Crazy," peaked at No. 44 in 1991.

In 1980, Taylor became the contributing lead vocalist and rhythm guitarist of country-pop band Exile. He performed with the group until 1989, when he left to pursue a solo career. After parting ways with Epic, Taylor reunited with Exile in 1995 and continues to perform with the band.

As a songwriter, Taylor has had his songs recorded by Travis Tritt and Shelby Lynne. He also co-wrote Janie Fricke's Number One single, "It Ain't Easy Bein' Easy."

Discography

Albums

Singles

Guest singles

Music videos

References

1948 births
American country singer-songwriters
American male singer-songwriters
Living people
Exile (American band) members
Epic Records artists
Country musicians from Kentucky